Xyphosia punctipennis is a species of tephritid or fruit flies in the genus Xyphosia of the family Tephritidae.

Distribution
Kazakhstan, Central Asia.

References

Tephritinae
Insects described in 1927
Diptera of Asia